Alice Barnes (born 17 July 1995) is an English racing cyclist, who rides for UCI Women's WorldTeam .

Career
Barnes enjoyed success at the UK School Games in Sheffield in 2011, where she not only won the individual mountain bike event, but also rode solo in the relay, beating the fastest of the four-rider teams by several seconds. She joined the British Cycling Olympic Academy Programme in 2013. Barnes was selected for the England team for the 2014 Commonwealth Games in Glasgow, where she finished fifth in the mountain bike race. She also rode at the 2014 UCI Road World Championships.

She finished second to Lizzie Armitstead in the elite women's race at the 2015 British National Road Race Championships in Lincoln, becoming national under-23 champion in the process. Later that year she was part of the Great Britain team that helped to deliver Armitstead to the World Championship elite road race title in Richmond, Virginia. On the road Barnes won the opening event of the Tour Series in Redditch. Racing in the 2017 National Women's Road Series, she won the Lincoln Grand Prix.

In September 2017, Barnes signed a contract with the  team. She remained with the team until the end of the 2022 season, before joining  on a two-year contract.

Personal life
She is the sister of fellow racing cyclist Hannah Barnes.

Major results
Source: 

2010
 1st  Cross-country, National Youth Mountain Bike Championships
2011
 1st  Cross-country, National Youth Mountain Bike Championships
 2nd Criterium, National Youth Road Championships
 National Youth Track Championships
2nd Madison (with Melissa Lowther)
2nd Points race
2013
 1st  Junior race, National Cyclo-cross Championships
2014
 5th Cross-country, Commonwealth Games
 7th Under-23 cross-country, UCI Mountain Bike & Trials World Championships
2015
 National Road Championships
1st  Under-23 road race
2nd Road race
 2nd Cross-country, National Mountain Bike Championships
 5th Women's Tour de Yorkshire
2016
 National Road Championships
1st  Under-23 road race
2nd Road race
2nd Criterium
 1st London Nocturne
 2nd Madison, National Track Championships (with Ellie Dickinson)
 4th Women's Tour de Yorkshire
 5th Overall Tour de Feminin-O cenu Českého Švýcarska
 10th RideLondon Grand Prix
2017
 2nd Overall BeNe Ladies Tour
1st  Young rider classification
1st Stage 1
 3rd  Road race, UEC European Under-23 Road Championships
 3rd Time trial, National Under-23 Road Championships
 6th Overall The Women's Tour
 7th Gent–Wevelgem
 8th Ronde van Drenthe
 9th Overall Women's Tour Down Under
2018
 1st  Team time trial, UCI Road World Championships
 1st Stage 6 Thüringen Rundfahrt der Frauen
 2nd Time trial, National Road Championships
 9th RideLondon Classique
2019
 National Road Championships
1st  Road race
1st  Time trial
 2nd Vuelta a la Comunitat Valenciana Feminas
 2nd Postnord UCI WWT Vårgårda West Sweden TTT
 European Games
4th Road race
4th Time trial
 UEC European Road Championships
5th Road race
9th Time trial
 5th Overall Healthy Ageing Tour
2020
 6th Three Days of Bruges–De Panne
 9th Overall Challenge by La Vuelta
 10th Grand Prix International d'Isbergues
2021
 1st Stage 3 Setmana Ciclista Valenciana
 7th Overall Healthy Ageing Tour
 7th Overall The Women's Tour
 8th Classic Brugge–De Panne
2022
 5th Overall Bloeizone Fryslân Tour
1st  Points classification
 6th Ronde van Drenthe
 8th Classic Brugge–De Panne
 8th Le Samyn des Dames
 10th Road race, Commonwealth Games

References

External links
 

1995 births
Living people
English female cyclists
Place of birth missing (living people)
British cycling road race champions
European Games competitors for Great Britain
Cyclists at the 2019 European Games
Cyclists at the 2014 Commonwealth Games
Commonwealth Games competitors for England